Steven Harvey Schiff (March 18, 1947 – March 25, 1998) was an American politician. He served as a member of the United States House of Representatives, representing the first district of New Mexico from 1989 until his death in 1998. Schiff was a Republican.

Schiff was born in Chicago, Illinois. He received a B.A. at the University of Illinois and a Juris Doctor from the University of New Mexico School of Law. Schiff joined the New Mexico Air National Guard in 1969, and he was a reservist until his death. He remained in New Mexico and was a lawyer until his election to Congress in 1989. From 1972 until 1981, Schiff was an assistant city attorney from Albuquerque. He was the Bernalillo County, New Mexico district attorney from 1981 until his entering Congress.

Schiff had an interest in UFOs and as a congressman pressured various government officials for information about them.

Schiff died of squamous-cell carcinoma during his fifth term in Congress in Albuquerque, New Mexico. Republican Heather Wilson won a special election to succeed him.

See also
 List of Jewish members of the United States Congress
 List of United States Congress members who died in office (1950–99)

References

External links

 
 
 Inventory of the Steven Schiff Papers, 1977–1998, University of New Mexico, University Libraries, Center for Southwest Research

1947 births
1998 deaths
20th-century American politicians
Deaths from cancer in New Mexico
Deaths from skin cancer
District attorneys in New Mexico
Jewish American military personnel
Jewish members of the United States House of Representatives
National Guard (United States) officers
New Mexico National Guard personnel
Politicians from Albuquerque, New Mexico
Politicians from Chicago
Republican Party members of the United States House of Representatives from New Mexico
University of Illinois Urbana-Champaign alumni
University of New Mexico School of Law alumni
20th-century American Jews
Military personnel from Illinois